Ikeduru Local Government Area (LGA) is located in the western part of Imo State, in southern Nigeria, West Africa.  It was previously carved out of Mbaitolu / Ikeduru LGA. It has its headquarters at Iho (Ihuo).

The current chairman of the Ikeduru LGA is Chief Sam Aka who hails from Iho-Dimeze. The Ikeduru LGA has the following neighbors, Mbaitolu, Mbano, and Mbaise, and they share a common culture and markets.

Towns and villages

Notable People
Placid Njoku

Emmanuel Iwuanyanwu

Samuel Anyanwu

Notes

[

Local Government Areas in Imo State
Local Government Areas in Igboland